Jumba la Mtwana is the site of historical structures and archaeological relics on the Indian Ocean coast of Kenya, lying close to the Mtwapa Creek, in Kilifi county, north of Mombasa. It dates back to  the fourteenth century. Its features include a mosque by the sea.

See also
Historic Swahili Settlements
Swahili architecture

References

External links 

Swahili people
Swahili city-states
Swahili architecture
History of Kenya
Monuments and memorials in Kenya
Archaeological sites in Kenya
Mombasa
Archaeological sites of Eastern Africa